This is a list of Unix commands as specified by IEEE Std 1003.1-2008, which is part of the Single UNIX Specification (SUS). These commands can be found on Unix operating systems and most Unix-like operating systems.

List

See also
 List of GNU Core Utilities commands
 GNOME Core Applications
 List of GNU packages
 List of KDE applications
 List of Unix daemons
 List of web browsers for Unix and Unix-like operating systems
 Unix philosophy

Footnotes

External links

 IEEE Std 1003.1,2004 specifications
 IEEE Std 1003.1,2008 specifications
 Rosetta Stone For *Nix – configurable list of equivalent programs for *nix systems.
 The Unix Acronym List: Unix Commands – explains the names of many Unix commands.

Unix programs
System administration